Halou is a band from San Francisco, California.

History
Ryan and Rebecca met in 1992 as the drummer and vocalist for the Santa Cruz-based band Anomie. That group would change Ryan's musical focus from techno pop (as the main keyboardist of Thinner) to more ambient guitar work, and transform Rebecca from a riot girl enthusiast into someone more at home with 4AD. Anomie's shoegaze sound met with rapid success in Santa Cruz on the strength of their album Burgundy Girl. The band later moved to San Francisco before the group split into two bands.  In late 1995 Ryan and Rebecca's half formed "anymore" (as in: "We're not Anomie anymore.") and released two CDs. After "anymore" dissolved, they became Halou, releasing their debut album, We Only Love You in 1998, on a small, independent label called Bedazzled. We Only Love You was followed by a compilation of non-album tracks entitled Sans Soucie in 1999. Their second album, Wiser, was released by Nettwerk in 2001, while the more recent, Wholeness & Separation and Halou, were released by Vertebrae in 2006 and 2008 respectively.

Halou's first album was broadcast on influential independent radio stations in Seattle and Los Angeles. In recent years, the band has received coverage from notable news sources, and they have been recognized for their production talents:

In 2008, Halou announced that they would no longer be making music under the moniker, and the three part collaboration was over.  Rebecca and Ryan Coseboom continue to perform together under the name Stripmall Architecture. Count continues to be involved in music as a producer and engineer, and is a member of a band called inu. In late 2015 Halou went back into the studio to record, releasing the track Stillbreathing on November 2, 2015.

Discography

Albums

We Only Love You (1998)
"Halfbreath" – 5:22
"Loop in Blue" – 6:19
"ifish" – 5:33
"La Mer" – 6:13
"Clip" – 2:51
"Present Tense" – 5:15
"It Was Safer When You Were Near" – 4:53
"You are One of Us" – 5:14
"Feeling Like This is Like to Fall Awake" – 5:16
"I'll Carry You (Full Version)" – 7:47

Wiser (2001)
"Milkdrunk" – 4:53
"Wiser" – 4:36
"Him to Me to You" – 4:11
"Political" – 3:24
"I'll Carry You" – 5:57
"Before There Was Color" – 4:28
"Oceanwide" – 7:13
"I Would Love to Give Up" – 3:52
"Feeling This is Like to Fall Awake" – 4:47
"We Only Love You" – 5:28
"Arrhythmia" – 5:41

Beneath Trembling Lanterns (as R/R Coseboom) (2006)
"Hollywood Ending" - 3:34
"Baby Beating Heart" - 3:55
"Soft Breasts And Ice Cream" - 7:01
"Eejit" - 7:02
"Shopworn" - 7:12
"Visitor Hummingbird" - 3:53
"Arrhythmia" - 5:46
"Little Dust Wing" - 7:06
"These Short Messages" - 7:47

Wholeness & Separation (2006)
"Separation" – 1:03
"Tubefed" – 3:11
"Honeythief" – 3:09
"Everything is OK" — 4:23
"Morsecode" – 3:20
"Stonefruit" – 3:21
"Your Friends" – 2:33
"The Ratio of Freckles to Stars" – 5:22
"Alaska" – 1:24
"Wholeness" – 4:03
"Today" – 2:36
"Hollow Bones" – 2:56
"I am Warm" – 4:12
"Things Stay the Same" – 4:29

Halou (2008)
"Professional"
"It Will All Make Sense in the Morning"
"Evensong"
"Eejit"
"Breath Makes Smoke"
"Seabright"
"Sneaky Creatures"
"Any Bird That Dares To Fly"
"Clipped"
"Hollywood Ending"
"Crumbs and Dust"
"We Wear Strings"
"Company"
"Skimming"

EPs

Wholeness (2003)
"Everything is OK"
"Ingenue"
"The Ratio of Freckles to Stars"
"Wholeness"
"Wiser (Different)"
"Firefly"

Separation (2006)
"Honeythief"
"Everything is OK (Different)"
"Exoskeleton"
"Far Too Far"
"Tubefed (Instrumental Score)"

Albatross (2006)
"Cello"
"Ingénue (Different)"
"Albatross"
"One Sunny Day"
"Night Divides The Girls"

Sawtooth (2008)
"It Will All Make Sense in the Morning"
"Evensong"
"Breath Makes Smoke"
"The Professional"
"Clipped"
"Hollywood Ending"

Compilation

Sans Soucie (1999)
"Present Tense (Different)"
"Lovesong (Original Demo)"
"Half-Gifts" (Cocteau Twins cover)
"I'll Carry You Two"
"Blue Eye Smile Girl"
"Words" (Low cover)
"You Are One Of Us (Grassy Knoll)"
"I'll Carry You (Edit)"
"Dog Dreams (Anymore)"
"Heroine (Anymore)"
"They Bite (Anymore)"
"It Was Safer When You Were Near (P'Taah)"

Other works
Halou was featured on a remix EP for the ambient dream pop group Plink entitled Thank You For Waiting, with a remix of Plink's song With Old Photographs.

References

External links

Nettwerk's website
Your Friends Music Video on Eithiriel
[ Halou's Wholeness & Separation album review at allmusic.com]

Musical groups established in 1995
Musical groups disestablished in 2008
American electronic music groups
Trip hop groups
Dream pop musical groups
Musical groups from San Francisco